The Mario Rosenstock Show is an Irish topical sketch comedy show that first aired on RTÉ Two television in Ireland on 12 November 2012.
The show features Mario Rosenstock's performing as characters from the world of sports, politics and entertainment.

A second series of the show had been confirmed in December 2012.
The second series began on Monday 16 September 2013.

Controversy
An episode of the first series contained a sketch showing a man spitting into a bucket before receiving Holy Communion at mass.
An association representing the Irish Catholic Bishops formally complained to RTÉ about the sketch, saying that it is "grossly offensive to all Catholics".

Character Sketches Series 1
 Michael D. Higgins
 Vincent Browne
 Joan Burton
 James Reilly
 Roy Keane
 Miriam O'Callaghan
 Micheál Martin
 Willie O'Dea
 Louis Walsh
 Daniel O'Donnell
 Enda Kenny
 Michael Flatley
 Mick Wallace
 Clare Daly
 Gerald Kean
 Luke 'Ming' Flanagan
 Eamon Gilmore
 Jim Corr
 Bertie Ahern
 Keith Duffy
 Gay Byrne
 Dáithí Ó Sé
 Pádraig Flynn
 Keith Barry
  David Murphy (RTÉ News)
 Leo Varadkar
 Ursula Halligan
 Ronan O'Gara
 Michael Noonan
 Michael O'Leary
 Love/Hate characters sketch

New Character Sketches Series 2
 Davy Fitzgerald
 Francis Brennan
 Alan Shatter
 Giovanni Trapattoni
 Donal Skehan
 José Mourinho
 Pat Kenny
 Eva Orsmond
 Aengus Mac Grianna
 John Delaney
 Mick McCarthy
 Brian Kerr
 Ryan Tubridy
 Jean Byrne
 Michael Noonan
 Michael Douglas

References

External links
RTE Site
Mario Rosenstock Official Site

2012 Irish television series debuts
RTÉ original programming